Gerald Carthrae  Thomas (October 29, 1894 – April 7, 1984) was a United States Marine Corps general who served as Assistant Commandant of the Marine Corps.  He retired from the Marine Corps in 1956 with more than 38 years of distinguished service which included duty on four continents, spanning two World Wars, Haiti and the Korean War.  During World War I, he fought in major offensives, including the Battle of Belleau Wood, and was awarded the Silver Star and the Purple Heart.

Biography
Gerald Carthrae Thomas was born on October 29, 1894, in Slater, Missouri.

Thomas was attending  Illinois Wesleyan University at the start of World War I.  When the U.S. entered the war and a call was made for men, Gerald, then a sophomore,  enlisted for military service. He was awarded a degree of Doctor of Laws by his alma mater on February 10, 1954.

Marine Corps service

Gerald enlisted in the Marine Corps on May 28, 1917.  He completed boot camp at Parris Island then joined the 1st Battalion 6th Marines.

World War I
Sailing for France in September 1917, Thomas saw action with the 6th Marines at Verdun, Belleau Wood, Soissons, and in the Meuse-Argonne Offensive (Champagne). He was promoted to sergeant and served as an intelligence sergeant.  During the battle in Belleau Wood, he led a squad of Marines and received the Silver Star for bravery.
At Soisson, his company sustained heavy losses and he became the acting platoon leader. In September 1918, he was commissioned a second lieutenant.   During his World War I service, in addition to the award of the Silver Star for valor, he was awarded the Purple Heart for wounds received in battle, and as a member of the 6th Marine Regiment, he became entitled to wear the French Fourragere. After participating in the occupation of Germany, he returned to the United States in July 1919.

Haiti
In November 1919, he joined the 1st Provisional Marine Brigade in Haiti, taking part in action against Haitian bandit forces until May 1921. During this time, he participated in the Battle of Port-au-Prince (1920) where he successfully ambushed a column of Caco rebels. In August 1921, he was assigned to the Marine barracks at Quantico, where he remained for the next two years. During that time he was detached for several months of duty with the guard company at the Disarmament Conference in Washington. He also completed the Company Officers Course at the Marine Corps Schools.

1920s-1930s
He was then stationed for two years at the Marine Barracks, Navy Yard, Charleston, South Carolina, and for a year at Camp Holabird, Maryland, where he completed a course in the Army Motor Transport School. In December 1928, after serving as Officer-in-Charge of Land Transportation at the Marine Barracks, Parris Island, South Carolina, he joined the 1st Brigade Marines in Haiti, and became aide to the commanding general. He returned to the United States in June 1931, entering the Army Infantry School at Fort Benning, Georgia, the following September.

Graduating in June 1932, Thomas was made an instructor in the Basic School at the Philadelphia Navy Yard. He remained there until August 1934, when he was ordered back to Quantico as a student in the Senior Course. After completing that course, he was ordered to China in July 1935, for duty with the Marine Detachment at the American Embassy in Peiping. He returned to the United States two years later to attend the Command and General Staff School at Fort Leavenworth, Kansas, and after graduating in June 1938, he joined the staff of the Marine Corps Schools at Quantico.

World War II
In May 1941, Thomas was transferred to Cairo, Egypt, as a naval observer, but he was recalled to Quantico two months later to become assistant operations officer of the 1st Marine Division. Named Operations Officer of the division in March 1942, he sailed for the South Pacific in that capacity two months later. He was awarded the Navy Distinguished Service Medal for his efforts in the assault and capture of Guadalcanal and Tulagi. He was appointed chief of staff of the division in September 1942, at Guadalcanal, and in July 1943, he became chief of staff of the 1st Marine Amphibious Corps, where he was awarded the Legion of Merit with Combat "V" in the Treasury-Bougainville operation. After participating in the Empress Augusta Bay operation at Bougainville, he returned to Marine Corps Headquarters in Washington, D.C., where he was made director of Plans and Policies in January 1944 and awarded a second Legion of Merit for outstanding service from January 1944 to November 1946.

Korean War
In July 1947, Thomas was named Commanding General of Fleet Marine Force, Western Pacific. After that unit was disbanded in March 1949, he became chief of staff of the Marine Corps Equipment Board at Quantico, later serving there as commanding general of the Landing Force Development Center.

He took command of the 1st Marine Division during the Korean War in April 1951, where he earned the Army Distinguished Service Cross and Army Distinguished Service Medal. He served in that capacity until January 1952, when he was relieved by Major general John T. Selden and returned to the United States. The following month he was promoted to the rank of lieutenant general and designated by President Truman as assistant commandant of the Marine Corps. He served in that billet until June 1954, and the following month became commandant of the Marine Corps Schools, Quantico.

Retirement, death
He retired from the Marine Corps and was promoted to the rank of general on January 1, 1956.

From 1957 to 1958, he was the first director of the National Security Council (NSC) Net Evaluation Subcommittee (NESC); succeeded by Thomas Hickey.

General Thomas died on April 7, 1984, at his home in Washington, D.C. He is buried in Arlington National Cemetery.

Awards and decorations
General Thomas' medals and decorations include:

See also

Battle of Belleau Wood
Assistant Commandant of the Marine Corps

Notes

References

Further reading

1894 births
1984 deaths
United States Marine Corps generals
United States Marine Corps World War II generals
United States Marine Corps personnel of World War I
United States Marine Corps personnel of the Korean War
Recipients of the Distinguished Service Cross (United States)
Recipients of the Silver Star
Recipients of the Legion of Merit
Recipients of the Distinguished Service Medal (US Army)
Commanders of the Order of Orange-Nassau
Recipients of the Air Medal
Recipients of the Navy Distinguished Service Medal
United States Army Command and General Staff College alumni
People from Saline County, Missouri
American military personnel of the Banana Wars
Burials at Arlington National Cemetery